Château-Salins (from 1941–44 Salzburgen) is a commune in the Moselle department in Grand Est in north-eastern France. Until 2015, Château-Salins was a subprefecture of the Moselle department.

History 
The town is relatively recent. The territory on which the castle, and later the town, was built was part of the domains of the bishopric of Metz.

Legend has it that pilgrims on their way to Saint-Nicolas-de-Port discovered a salt spring. Around 1340, the regent Elisabeth of Austria, widow of Duke Ferry IV, had a castle built to protect the exploitation of this spring. In order to control the ducal building, Bishop Adhémar de Monteil also had a fortress built, which he named Beaurepaire, at some distance from there.

See also 
 Communes of the Moselle department

References

External links
 

Communes of Moselle (department)
Duchy of Lorraine